Eugene C. Doyle (February 6, 1925 – August 20, 1989) was an American politician.

Doyle was born in Chicago, Illinois. He served in the United States Army during World War II. Doyle lived in Northlake, Illinois with his wife and family. He served as mayor of Northlake from 1968 to 1989 and was  a Democrat. Doyle also served in the Illinois House of Representatives from 1983 to 1985 and was a Democrat. He served as a commissioner of the Salt Lake Water Conservation District. Doyle died at the Elmhurst Memorial Hospital in Elmhurst, Illinois.

Notes

1925 births
1989 deaths
Politicians from Chicago
People from Northlake, Illinois
Military personnel from Illinois
Mayors of places in Illinois
Democratic Party members of the Illinois House of Representatives
20th-century American politicians